The Bachelor of Journalism (B.J.) degree is a degree awarded at some universities to students who have studied journalism in a three or four year undergraduate program. In the United States, some schools that do not award the B.J. degree instead confer a Bachelor of Arts, Journalism (B.A.J.), Bachelor of Arts in Journalism and Mass Communication (B.A.J.M.C.) or Bachelor of Science, Journalism (BSJ) that is often part of or in conjunction with a course of study in mass communication. Yet another epithetological version of the degree, conferred by The Henry W. Grady College of Journalism and Mass Communication at the University of Georgia, is the A.B.J. degree, the Latin equivalent of the B.J./B.A.J.

The Accrediting Council on Education in Journalism and Mass Communication at the University of Kansas accredits university level journalism programs in the United States. There are currently 109 such accredited programs in 40 states.

Bachelor of Journalism in India 

In India,  Bachelor of Journalism is of 3 years. Journalism courses in India are known by various names like B.J. (Bachelor of Journalism), B.J. (Hons) (Bachelor of Journalism (Honours)),  B.C.J. (Bachelor of Communication and Journalism), B.M.M. (Bachelor of Mass Media), B.A. - J.M.C (Bachelor of Arts in Journalism and Mass Communication), B.A.- Mass Communication (Bachelor of Arts in Mass Communication). Employability prospects vary by the reputation of the institute and course.

Bachelor of Journalism in South Africa 

In South Africa, Rhodes University offers the primary accomplishment for Journalism students. While other universities and colleges offer diplomas, or B.A. degrees with media studies as a major, Rhodes University combines practical knowledge with theoretical frameworks to compound a highly respected degree. Coupled with an intense selection process, only just over 120 students are permitted to 2nd Year, with even less permitted to the 4th Year Specialisation Course. Without this 4th Year Course, graduates depart with a 3 Year B.A. Degree, with Journalism and Media Studies as one of their majors.

Schools of journalism 

 Asia
Delhi School of Journalism
 Renmin University of China
 The UST Journalism School
 University of the Philippines College of Mass Communication
 Makhanlal Chaturvedi National University of Journalism and Communication, Bhopal, India 
 Delhi College of Arts and Commerce, Delhi University, India
 Indian Institute of Mass Communication, Delhi, India
 Christ Nagar College, Trivandrum, Kerala
 Thammasat University Faculty of Journalism and Mass Communication, Thailand
 Hong Kong Baptist University
 University of Hong Kong
 Chinese University of Hong Kong
 Hong Kong Shue Yan University
 Chu Hai College of Higher Education
 Hang Seng Management College
 Peking University
International Institute of Management Media & IT (IIMMI)
Heritage Institute of Management & Communication, New Delhi, India
National Institute of Mass Communication, New Delhi, India

 Australia
 RMIT University, Melbourne
 University of Canberra
 Charles Sturt University, Bathurst, New South Wales
 Bond University, Gold Coast
 Griffith University, Gold Coast
 James Cook University, Townsville
 La Trobe University, Melbourne
 Queensland University of Technology, Brisbane
 The University of Queensland
 University of the Sunshine Coast
 University of Wollongong

 Canada
 Concordia University, Montreal
 Carleton University, Ottawa
 Kwantlen Polytechnic University, Surrey, British Columbia
 Toronto Metropolitan University, Toronto
 Thompson Rivers University, Kamloops
 University of King's College, Halifax
 Mount Royal University, Calgary

 South Africa
 University of Pretoria, Pretoria
 Rhodes University
 Stellenbosch University, Universiteit Stellenbosch

 United States

 Arizona State University Walter Cronkite School of Journalism and Mass Communication

 Drake University School of Journalism and Mass Communication
 Temple University Klein College of Media and Communication
 Northwestern University Medill School of Journalism
 New York University Arthur L. Carter Journalism Institute
 University of Maryland Philip Merrill College of Journalism
 Ohio University E.W. Scripps School of Journalism
 University of Colorado at Boulder
 Columbia University Graduate School of Journalism
 University of Florida College of Journalism and Communications
 Florida International University School of Journalism and Mass Communication
 University of Georgia College of Journalism and Mass Communication
 University of Kansas William Allen White School of Journalism and Mass Communications
 University of Missouri School of Journalism
 University of Minnesota University of Minnesota School of Journalism and Mass Communication
 University of Montana School of Journalism
 University of Nebraska-Lincoln
 University of North Carolina at Chapel Hill School of Journalism and Mass Communication
 University of Texas at Austin
West Virginia University Perley Isaac Reed School of Journalism
 Indiana University
 California State University, Northridge
 University of North Texas Mayborn School of Journalism
 University of Montana School of Journalism
 University of Mississippi School of Journalism and New Media
 University of South Carolina  School of Journalism and Mass Communication
 Suffolk University College of Arts and Sciences
 Stony Brook University School of Journalism

 The Netherlands
 Hogeschool Utrecht HU University of Applied Sciences - Oldest School of Journalism in Europe
 Christelijke Hogeschool Ede CHE Christian University of Applied Sciences
 Fontys Hogescholen Tilburg Fontys University of Applied Sciences
 Hogeschool Windesheim Zwolle Windesheim University of Applied Sciences

References

External links
Accrediting Council on Education in Journalism and Mass Communication
Media, Journalism and Mass Communication College

Journalism, Bachelor
Indian journalism